John Carter "Jack" Montgomery (Elizabethtown, Kentucky, November 22, 1881 – Washington, D.C., June 7, 1948) was an American equestrian who competed in the 1912 Summer Olympics.

Montgomery graduated from West Point in 1903, and was commissioned in the 7th Cavalry Regiment. In 1907, he married Virginia Lee, daughter of Major General Fitzhugh Lee. They had two sons and two daughters.

He was part of the American team, which won the bronze medal in the equestrian team event. In the individual competition he finished ninth and in the individual dressage competition he finished twentieth. He was also part of the American team, which finished fourth in the team jumping competition. He also competed in the polo tournament at the 1920 Summer Olympics, winning a bronze medal.

During World War I, Montgomery served with the American Expeditionary Forces in France, receiving a temporary promotion to colonel and the Distinguished Service Medal. From July 2, 1924 to March 13, 1927, he was commanding officer of 1st Squadron, 10th Cavalry at Fort Huachuca. In 1927, Montgomery retired from military service as a lieutenant colonel. In 1929, he joined First Boston Corp, retiring in 1946 as a vice president. In 1930, Montgomery was advanced to colonel on the Army retired list.

Montgomery and his wife settled in Alexandria, Virginia after his retirement from First Boston. He died at Walter Reed Hospital in Washington, D.C. and was buried at Arlington National Cemetery on June 10, 1948.

References

External links
profile

1881 births
1948 deaths
People from Elizabethtown, Kentucky
United States Military Academy alumni
Military personnel from Kentucky
Equestrians at the 1912 Summer Olympics
American male equestrians
Olympic bronze medalists for the United States in equestrian
American event riders
Medalists at the 1912 Summer Olympics
United States Army personnel of World War I
Recipients of the Distinguished Service Medal (US Army)
American polo players
Polo players at the 1920 Summer Olympics
Olympic medalists in polo
Olympic polo players of the United States
Medalists at the 1920 Summer Olympics
United States Army colonels
American business executives
People from Alexandria, Virginia
Burials at Arlington National Cemetery